The 2020–21 Maryland Bobcats FC season was the club's first in the National Independent Soccer Association and first as a professional team.

Overview 
Following an application in late July 2020, Maryland Bobcats FC was admitted into the National Independent Soccer Association on October 13, 2020. The team had previously been members in leagues such as the United Premier Soccer League, where it went undefeated and won a national championship in fall 2019, and the National Premier Soccer League. Prior to officially joining NISA, Maryland competed in the inaugural NISA Independent Cup as a member of the NPSL and took part as a member of the Mid-Atlantic Region. Additionally, the team played a friendly against NISA member Chattanooga FC following the conclusion of the fall 2019 season.

On August 14, 2020 Maryland also joined in the Eastern Premier Soccer League, an amateur league affiliate of NISA, and began fielding a reserve team in it in spring 2021.

On March 24, 2021, former Nigeria women's national football team manager Samuel Okpodu was named head coach for 2021.

Roster

Players

Staff

Transfers

In

Friendlies

Competitions

NISA Independent Cup 

Prior to joining NISA, the Bobcats were announced as one of the 11 non-association teams taking part in the inaugural NISA Independent Cup on July 1. The regional tournament acted as both a pre-season and chance to "provide a platform for professional and amateur independent clubs to play together on a national stage."

Maryland was drawn into the Mid-Atlantic Region alongside the New York Cosmos, NISA expansion side New Amsterdam FC, and fellow NPSL side FC Baltimore Christos.

On July 24, NISA announced that the Mid-Atlantic Region tournament was postponed due to a surge of COVID-19 cases in Maryland and the subsequent closing of the Maryland SoccerPlex to professional sports. On July 28, NISA announced a majority of the region's games would be played at Evergreen Sportsplex in Leesburg, Virginia. Following a weather postponement that forced the Bobcat's final game to be played at a neutral site, the team won the Mid-Atlantic Region title on October 10 when the Cosmos and FC Baltimore played to a 2–2 draw allowing Maryland to finish atop the table via goal differential.

Standings

Matches

2020 Fall Season 

Initial details for the NISA Fall 2020 season were released on June 4, 2020. Maryland did not take part in the fall in an official capacity.

2021 Spring Season

NISA Legends Cup 
NISA announced initial spring season plans in early February 2021, including starting the season with a tournament in Chattanooga, Tennessee with a standard regular season to follow. The tournament, now called the NISA Legends Cup, was officially announced on March 10 and is scheduled to run between April 13 and 25. All nine NISA members teams taking part in the Spring were divided into three team groups and played a round robin schedule. The highest placing group winner automatically qualified for the tournament final, while the second and third highest finishing teams overall played one-another in a semifinal to determine a second finalist.

The Bobcats were drawn into Group 1 alongside Michigan Stars FC and the returning San Diego 1904 FC.

Standings

Group 1 results

Matches

Regular season 
The Spring Season schedule was announced on March 18 with each association member playing eight games, four home and four away, in a single round-robin format.

Standings

Results summary

Matches

U.S. Open Cup 

As a team playing in a recognized professional league, Maryland would normally be automatically qualified for the U.S. Open Cup. However, with the 2021 edition shorted due to the COVID-19 pandemic, NISA has only been allotted 1 to 2 teams spots. On March 29, U.S. Soccer announced 2020 Fall Champion Detroit City FC as NISA's representative in the tournament.

Squad statistics

Appearances and goals 

|-
! colspan="14" style="background:#dcdcdc; text-align:center"| Goalkeepers

|-
! colspan="14" style="background:#dcdcdc; text-align:center"| Defenders

|-
! colspan="14" style="background:#dcdcdc; text-align:center"| Midfielders

|-
! colspan="14" style="background:#dcdcdc; text-align:center"| Forwards

|-
! colspan="14" style="background:#dcdcdc; text-align:center"| Left during season
|-
|}

Goal scorers

Disciplinary record

References

External links 

 

Maryland Bobcats FC
Maryland Bobcats FC
Maryland Bobcats FC
Maryland Bobcats FC